Trimetopon is a genus of snakes in the family Colubridae. The genus is native to Costa Rica and Panama. Species in the genus Trimetopon are known commonly as tropical ground snakes.

Species
The following six species are recognised as being valid:

Trimetopon barbouri  – Barbour's tropical ground snake
Trimetopon gracile  – Günther's tropical ground snake
Trimetopon pliolepis  – Cope's tropical ground snake
Trimetopon simile  – Dunn's tropical ground snake
Trimetopon slevini  – Slevin's tropical ground snake
Trimetopon viquezi  – Víquez's tropical ground snake

Nota bene: A binomial authority in parentheses indicates that the species was originally described in a genus other than Trimetopon.

References

Further reading
Beolens, Bo; Watkins, Michael; Grayson, Michael (2011). The Eponym Dictionary of Reptiles. Baltimore: Johns Hopkins University Press. xiii + 296 pp. .
Cope ED (1885). "Twelfth Contribution to the Herpetology of Tropical America". Proceedings of the American Philosophical Society 22: 167–194. (Trimetopon, new genus, p. 177).

Colubrids
Snake genera
Taxa named by Edward Drinker Cope